Rizvand is a city in Gilan Province, Iran.

Rizvand or Riz Vand or Rezawand or Rizavand may also refer to:
 Rizvand, Kermanshah
 Rizvand, Mahidasht, Kermanshah Province
 Rizvand-e Ali Akbar, Kermanshah Province
 Rizvand-e Najaf, Kermanshah Province

See also
 Rizehvand (disambiguation)